The 1986–87 season was the 85th in the history of the Western Football League.

The league champions for the second time in their history were Saltash United. The champions of Division One were Swanage Town & Herston.

Final tables

Premier Division
The Premier Division remained at 22 clubs after Shepton Mallet Town were relegated and left to join the Somerset County League. One club joined:

Radstock Town, runners-up in the First Division.

First Division
The First Division remained at 22 clubs, after Radstock Town were promoted to the Premier Division. One new club joined:

Calne Town, joining from the Wiltshire League.

References

Western Football League seasons
6